The Subic Spanish Gate, located at the corner of Dewey Avenue and Samson Road in the City of Olongapo, Zambales province, Philippines, was built in 1885 when the Spanish Navy authorized the construction of the Arsenal de Olongapo, after King Alfonso XII of Spain issued a royal decree declaring Subic Bay as a naval port in 1884.

The gate served as the West Gate of the arsenal and faced the Spanish-era settlement of Olongapo. A high wall of locally quarried stone connected it to the south gate that faced the waterfront.

In addition to being used as the main entrance and exit to the naval station, the gate was also used as a jail during both the Spanish and the American occupation.

On November 26, 2013, the Spanish Gate was declared a historical landmark by the National Historical Commission of the Philippines (NHCP). The NHCP affixed on the wall of the gate a marker which reads "Himpilang Pandagat ng Look ng Subic" ("Naval Station of Subic Bay").

Gallery

References

Gates
Buildings and structures in Olongapo
Spanish colonial infrastructure in the Philippines
Tourist attractions in Zambales